Irwin Elliott Zucker (August 6, 1927 – August 18, 2001) was an American television and film composer, conductor, music arranger, television producer, and co-founder of the New American Orchestra, later renamed the American Jazz Philharmonic.

Life and career
Elliott was born Irwin Elliott Zucker in Hartford, Connecticut. He was of Romanian Jewish descent. Elliott graduated from the Hartt School of Music and worked as a jazz pianist in New York and Paris in the 1950s. He continued his post-graduate studies in composition with Arnold Franchetti, Isadore Freed, Bohuslav Martinů, and Lukas Foss, but it was Judy Garland who brought Elliott to California to become an arranger for her television show.

Elliott continued his run in television as music director for Andy Williams' long-running series and later produced and conducted the NBC television special Live From Studio 8H: 100 Years of America's Popular Music.  He also wrote themes for television shows Night Court, and co-wrote the themes to Barney Miller and Charlie's Angels with Allyn Ferguson. He is listed in New Grove's Dictionary of American Music and was awarded an honorary doctorate from his alma mater, the University of Hartford's Hartt School of Music.

Elliott was co-founder and music director of the American Jazz Philharmonic (formerly the New American Orchestra) and creator of the Henry Mancini Institute. The original name of the Orchestra was "The Big O" and was the largest jazz orchestra of its kind featuring over 92 musicians. Elliott blended the classical European style orchestra with modern American jazz style. His professional repertoire was diverse, highlighted by stints as music director for the Academy Awards, Emmy Awards, Kennedy Center Honors and the 1984 Summer Olympics. In addition, he holds the distinction of serving as music director of the Grammy Awards for 30 consecutive years.

He had an accomplished career in film, scoring numerous hit movies, including Sibling Rivalry, The Jerk, Oh God!, and Where's Poppa?. He also produced the Blade Runner soundtrack album with the New American Orchestra.

Death
Elliott served as music director of the Henry Mancini Institute until his death from a brain tumor on August 18, 2001.

Selected discography
 Are You Lonesome Tonight?...Wonderful Melodies of the Sixties (Kapp, 1961)
 The Orchestra (with Allyn Ferguson) (FNAM, 1979)

Selected filmography
 The Happiest Millionaire (1967)
 The Comic (1969)
 Where's Poppa? (1970)
 T.R. Baskin (1971)
 Support Your Local Gunfighter (1971)
 Get to Know Your Rabbit (1972)
 Oh, God! (1977)
 Just You and Me, Kid (1979)
 The Jerk (1979)
 Sibling Rivalry (1990)

Television
 McHale's Navy (29 episodes, 1965–1966)
 Pistols 'n' Petticoats (9 episodes, 1966–1967)
 The New Dick Van Dyke Show (7 episodes, 1971–1974)
 The Rookies (14 episodes, 1972–1975)
 Really Raquel (1974)
 Barney Miller (1974-1982) (with Allyn Ferguson)
 Charlie's Angels (1976-1981) (with Allyn Ferguson)
 Night Court (1984-1992)

Awards and nominations

See also 
 Charlie's Angels
 Bel-Tone Records

References

External links

1927 births
2001 deaths
American male conductors (music)
American film score composers
American male film score composers
American music arrangers
University of Hartford Hartt School alumni
Songwriters from Connecticut
American television composers
American television producers
Burials at Westwood Village Memorial Park Cemetery
Musicians from Hartford, Connecticut
Writers from Hartford, Connecticut
Pupils of Lukas Foss
Songwriters from New York (state)
20th-century American composers
Classical musicians from New York (state)
20th-century American conductors (music)
20th-century American male musicians
American male songwriters
Deaths from brain cancer in the United States